Jesús Hernández de La Torre (born 29 June 1989), commonly known as Piojo, is a Spanish footballer who plays for Guijuelo CF as a winger.

Football career
Born in Salamanca, Castile and León, Piojo was a product of hometown UD Salamanca's youth system, and made senior debuts with the reserves in the 2007–08 season, in the Tercera División. On 28 October 2007 he made his professional debut, playing the last 5 minutes of a 2–2 away draw against SD Eibar in the Segunda División.

On 28 August of the following year Piojo was loaned to Barakaldo CF of the Segunda División B. On 21 August 2009 he moved to fellow league team CD Guijuelo, also in a temporary deal, and signed permanently with the latter in September 2010.

On 31 August 2011 Piojo returned to Salamanca B; he was promoted to the main squad halfway through the campaign. He subsequently resumed his career in the third level with SD Huesca, Gimnàstic de Tarragona, UCAM Murcia CF and Guijuelo.

References

External links
Piojo Hernández at Unionistas de Salamanca BD

1989 births
Living people
Sportspeople from Salamanca
Spanish footballers
Footballers from Castile and León
Association football wingers
Segunda División players
Segunda División B players
Tercera División players
UD Salamanca players
Barakaldo CF footballers
CD Guijuelo footballers
SD Huesca footballers
Gimnàstic de Tarragona footballers
UCAM Murcia CF players
Unionistas de Salamanca CF players
Palencia CF players